James Ridout "Jesse" Winchester Jr. (May 17, 1944 – April 11, 2014) was an American-Canadian musician and songwriter. He was born and raised in the southern United States. Opposed to the Vietnam War, he moved to Canada in 1967 to avoid being drafted into the US military while the US engaged in the Vietnam War and began his career as a solo artist. His highest-charting recordings were of his own songs, "Yankee Lady" in 1970 and "Say What" in 1981. He became a Canadian citizen in 1973, gained amnesty in the U.S. in 1977 and resettled in Memphis, Tennessee in 2002.

Winchester was best known as a songwriter. His songs were recorded by many notable artists, including Patti Page, Elvis Costello, Jimmy Buffett, Joan Baez, Jerry Garcia, Anne Murray, The Weather Girls, Reba McEntire, the Everly Brothers, Lyle Lovett, Emmylou Harris, George Strait, Gary Allan, Willie Nelson, and Michael Stanley. A number of these recordings achieved positions on various charts.

Biography

Early life
Winchester was born at Barksdale Army Air Field, near Bossier City, Louisiana, United States, and raised in northern Mississippi through age 12, when his family relocated to Memphis, Tennessee. Winchester was one of three children born to James Ridout Winchester Sr. (1917–1962) and Frances Ellyn Manire Winchester (1920–2010). In 1952, a heart attack left his father unable to farm.  Through his father's side, he is part of the Lee family of Virginia (Henry Lee II and Richard Henry Lee were two of his 4th-great-grandfathers).  He graduated from Christian Brothers High School in Memphis in 1962 as a merit finalist, a National Honor Society member and the salutatorian of his class. He graduated from Williams College, in Williamstown, Massachusetts, in 1966. Upon receiving his draft notice the following year, Winchester moved to Montreal, Quebec, Canada, to avoid being drafted into the US military while the US was involved in a war with Vietnam.  "I was so offended by someone's coming up to me and presuming to tell me who I should kill and what my life was worth," he told Rolling Stone magazine in 1977.

Winchester began playing guitar in bands while still in high school. He played in Germany during college study abroad and after graduation. Upon arriving in Quebec in 1967, he joined a local band, Les Astronautes. He also began writing songs, which he performed as a solo artist at the Montreal Folk Workshop and at coffeehouses throughout eastern Canada, adding impetus to a revival in folk music that was taking place across Canada. Under the auspices of the Band's Robbie Robertson, another Canadian, Winchester began his recording career in 1970 with a self-titled album released on the Ampex label.

Career

Winchester released several albums during the 1970s. Because of his status as a draft-evader, entailing that he was subject to arrest had he entered the country, he was unable to tour in the United States, and he became recognized primarily as a songwriter. His best-known songs include "Yankee Lady", "The Brand New Tennessee Waltz", "Mississippi, You're on My Mind", "A Showman's Life","Biloxi", "That's a Touch I Like", and "Every Word You Say". These and others have been recorded by numerous artists.  His 1970 recording of his song "Black Dog" preceded the release of Led Zeppelin's different song of the same name by a year.

In 1974, Winchester often performed at the Hotel Le Chatelet in Morin Heights, Quebec, run by several expatriate Tennesseans who had come to Canada in 1972. David "Butch" McDade and Jeff "Stick" Davis moved to Quebec to become part of Jesse Winchester and the Rhythm Aces. Winchester was the first to record the songs "Third Rate Romance" and "The End Is Not in Sight", both written by Russell Smith. Smith traveled to Montreal to assist in the recording of the album Learn to Love It at Studio Six. Smith, Davis and McDade later were original members of the Amazing Rhythm Aces.

Upon his election in 1976, President Jimmy Carter declared he would grant amnesty to draft evaders, except those who had deserted or had become citizens of another country. Winchester had by then become a Canadian citizen, but Barry Bozeman, his manager at the time, convinced Carter on Winchester's behalf to broaden the amnesty.

Winchester's first appearance in the U.S. was a sold-out performance in Burlington, Vermont, on April 21, 1977. On June 10 he appeared alongside Little Feat, Emmylou Harris and Bonnie Raitt  on Burt Sugarman's The Midnight Special.

"I'm Gonna Miss You, Girl", written by Winchester, was recorded by American country music artist Michael Martin Murphey and released in October 1987, as the lead single from the album River of Time. The song peaked at number 3 on the Billboard Hot Country Singles chart and at number 4 on the Canadian RPM Country Tracks chart. The version recorded by Murphy omits the somewhat sadder second part of the song. Winchester's version is on his album Love Filling Station.

Later career
Winchester was nominated for the Best Country Male Vocalist award at the Juno Awards of 1990. In 2002, he moved back to the United States,  settling in Memphis with his girlfriend, Cindy. That year, his song "Step by Step", from the album Let the Rough Side Drag, was used as background music for the montage that ended the first season of the television program The Wire. He received a Lifetime Achievement Award from the American Society of Composers, Authors and Publishers in 2007. Winchester continued to record and perform throughout the United States and Canada, releasing his tenth studio album, Love Filling Station, in 2009.

In 2011, Winchester was diagnosed with cancer of the esophagus and underwent treatment for the next couple of months. He was later given a clean bill of health from his doctor and resumed touring. Quiet About It, a tribute record to Winchester, was released in 2012, featuring James Taylor, Lyle Lovett, Lucinda Williams, Rosanne Cash and Jimmy Buffett, who spearheaded the project, among others.

In April 2014, it was revealed that Winchester was gravely ill and receiving hospice care at his home, in Charlottesville, Virginia. He died there on the morning of April 11, 2014, aged 69, from bladder cancer. He is survived by his wife, Cindy and three children from a previous marriage: James, Alice and Marcus Lee.

Winchester’s final CD, A Reasonable Amount of Trouble, was released in September 2014, with liner notes by his friend Jimmy Buffett. It was nominated for two Grammy awards.  Rolling Stone called it "a gentle collection of playful songs about love, memory and gratitude that amounts to one of the most moving, triumphant albums of Winchester's 45 year career."

Discography

Albums

Singles

Appearances

References

External links

Official website 

Jesse Winchester at Appleseed Recordings
radio interview at WRN
HOTSEAT- Southern gent? Folk legend moves to town
Fame & Fortune: Jesse Winchester

1944 births
2014 deaths
Canadian male singer-songwriters
Canadian folk singers
Canadian country singer-songwriters
Deaths from bladder cancer
Vietnam War draft evaders
Williams College alumni
Singers from Louisiana
Singers from Mississippi
People from Bossier City, Louisiana
Attic Records (Canada) artists
Deaths from cancer in Virginia
American expatriate musicians in Canada
20th-century Canadian male singers
20th-century American musicians
Bearsville Records artists
Stony Plain Records artists